Pseudevippa is a genus of spiders in the family Lycosidae. It was first described in 1910 by Eugène Simon. , it contains only one species, Pseudevippa cana, found in Namibia.

References

Lycosidae
Monotypic Araneomorphae genera